Half-moon cookie could mean:
Half-moon cookie (Philippines), a crescent-shaped cookie from the Philippines
Black and white cookie, a cookie frosted half with vanilla and half with chocolate frosting, found in New York City and Central New York

See also
 List of cookies